The Two Orphans (Italian:Le due orfanelle) is a 1954 French-Italian historical melodrama film directed by Giacomo Gentilomo and starring Myriam Bru, Milly Vitale and André Luguet. It is based on the 1874 play The Two Orphans by Adolphe d'Ennery and Eugène Cormon, one of a large number of film adaptations. It was shot in eastmancolor, with sets designed by the art director Virgilio Marchi.

Cast

See also
 Orphans of the Storm (1921)
 The Two Orphans (1933)
 The Two Orphans (1942)
 The Two Orphans (1965)
 The Two Orphans (1976)

References

Bibliography 
 Klossner, Michael. The Europe of 1500-1815 on Film and Television. McFarland, 2002.

External links 
 

1954 films
Italian historical drama films
French historical drama films
1950s historical drama films
1950s French-language films
1950s Italian-language films
Films directed by Giacomo Gentilomo
Films about orphans
French films based on plays
Films set in Paris
French Revolution films
Films scored by Nino Rota
1950s multilingual films
French multilingual films
Italian multilingual films
Melodrama films
1950s Italian films
1950s French films